The 2015–2016 international cricket season was from October 2015 to April 2016.

Season overview

Rankings
The following are the rankings at the beginning of the season.

October

South Africa in India

Australia in Bangladesh

Australia were scheduled to tour Bangladesh for 2 Tests in October, but the tour was cancelled by Cricket Australia due to security concerns.

Ireland in Zimbabwe

England vs. Pakistan in United Arab Emirates

2015 ICC Under-19 Cricket World Cup Qualifier

West Indies in Sri Lanka

Afghanistan in Zimbabwe

Pakistan Women in West Indies

Ireland in Namibia

Kenya in Namibia

November

Sri Lanka Women in New Zealand

New Zealand in Australia

Zimbabwe in Bangladesh

Hong Kong in United Arab Emirates

Papua New Guinea vs.  Nepal in United Arab Emirates

Zimbabwe Women in Bangladesh

Hong Kong vs. Oman in United Arab Emirates

Papua New Guinea vs. Afghanistan in United Arab Emirates

Oman in United Arab Emirates

Afghanistan vs. Hong Kong in United Arab Emirates

Afghanistan vs. Oman in United Arab Emirates

2015 ICC Women's World Twenty20 Qualifier

Final standings

 Qualified for the 2016 ICC Women's World Twenty20.

December

Sri Lanka in New Zealand

West Indies in Australia

Zimbabwe vs. Afghanistan in United Arab Emirates

England in South Africa

India vs. Pakistan in Sri Lanka

India and Pakistan were scheduled to play a limited-overs series in December but the tour was eventually cancelled because the Indian cricket team did not receive security clearance from the government.

January

India in Australia

Pakistan in New Zealand

Scotland in Hong Kong

Netherlands in United Arab Emirates

Ireland vs. Papua New Guinea in Australia

2016 Under-19 Cricket World Cup

India Women in Australia

February

Australia in New Zealand

Scotland in United Arab Emirates

Scotland vs. Netherlands in United Arab Emirates

England Women in South Africa

Sri Lanka in India

Ireland in United Arab Emirates

Sri Lanka Women in India

Australia Women in New Zealand

West Indies Women in South Africa

2016 Asia Cup Qualifier

2016 Asia Cup

March

Australia in South Africa

2016 ICC World Twenty20

First round

Super 10

2016 ICC Women's World Twenty20

April

Namibia vs. Afghanistan in India

Namibia in Nepal

2016 ICC Africa Twenty20 Division Two

Points table

References

External links
 2015-16 season on ESPN Cricinfo

 
2015 in cricket
2016 in cricket